Atlantic Flight refers to the following films:

 Atlantic Flight (1931 film), Italian short documentary film
 Atlantic Flight (1937 film), American film